Clear Springs Air Force Auxiliary Field is a former United States Air Force facility located  East of New Braunfels, Texas near Clear Springs.

History
Originally opened as Clear Springs Auxiliary Field #5 when it was leased in 1940, before being surplus on June 7, 1944. After being reactivated during the Cold War as Clear Springs Air Force Auxiliary Field, the installation transferred to the Army on December 15, 1956; it was then assigned to Randolph Air Force Base from May 1, 1964 until June 9, 1967 when it closed.  A plan to move F-15 Eagles to the base in 1982 was considered. The airfield currently serving New Braunfels is the New Braunfels Regional Airport.

References

Military installations closed in 1967
Installations of the United States Air Force in Texas
1940 establishments in Texas
1967 disestablishments in Texas
Companies based in New Braunfels, Texas